Claudia H. Kawas is an American neurologist. As the Al and Trish Nichols Chair in clinical neurology at the University of California, Irvine, Kawas established the Leisure World Cohort Study to monitor the health and well-being of people 90 and older in Laguna Woods, California.

Early life and education
Kawas was born to parents Elias and Jeanette Kawas and her family moved to Madisonville, Kentucky when she was in sixth grade. She attended Madisonville North Hopkins High School and was a member of their speech and debate team. As a senior, she won first place in the extemporaneous speaking and dramatic interpretation division and was judged as the top speaker of the entire tournament.

Upon graduating in 1970, Kawas attended Swarthmore College for her undergraduate degree and completed her medical studies at the University of Louisville. During her undergraduate degree, Kawas was encouraged to study brain injuries as a physician.

Career
Upon completing her medical degree, Kawas enrolled at Johns Hopkins University for a two-year fellowship in 1985. Upon completing the fellowship, she remained at the institution to study Alzheimer's disease. As a faculty member, she collaborated with epidemiologist Walter Stewart and partook in the Baltimore Longitudinal Study on Aging. In 1997, she co-led a study examining the impact of estrogen on the risk of Alzheimer's disease. Kawas left Johns Hopkins in 2000 to accept a similar faculty appointment at the University of California, Irvine (UC Irvine).

As the Al and Trish Nichols Chair in clinical neurology, Kawas established the Leisure World Cohort Study to monitor the health and well-being of people 90 and older in Laguna Woods, California. In 2012, she was honored as a Visionary Woman for her clinical contributions to Alzheimer’s disease research and care by the Orange County Chapter of the Alzheimer’s Association. The following year, the National Institute on Aging renewed its funding for the Leisure World Cohort Study for another five years.

In 2017, Kawas was presented with the Khalid Iqbal, Ph.D., Lifetime Achievement Award in Alzheimer’s Disease Research for her "for her numerous contributions to clinical and epidemiological research in Alzheimer’s disease, aging and dementia." In the same year, she also received the American Academy of Neurology's Potamkin Prize for dementia research.

References

External links

Living people
American neurologists
Women neurologists
Swarthmore College alumni
University of Louisville alumni
Johns Hopkins University faculty
University of California, Irvine faculty
Year of birth missing (living people)